Eugène Goossens was the name of three notable musicians (from the same family). Listed chronologically:
Eugène Goossens, père (1845–1906), conductor (opera)
Eugène Goossens, fils (1867–1958), violinist and conductor
Sir Eugene Aynsley Goossens (1893–1962), composer and conductor (son & grandson)
See also
Eugene Goossen (1920–1997), American art critic and historian